Rani Kuthir Baki Itihash is a 2006 Bangladeshi drama-mystery film. The film was the directorial debut of news anchor and prominent media personality Samia Zaman and was produced by Bangladeshi satellite TV channel NTV, their second film production. The film starred Ferdous and Popy as the lead pair with Alamgir, Tarik Anam Khan, Rahamat Ali, MM Morshed, Ahsanul Haque Minu and others in supporting roles.

Cast
 Ferdous - Rudra 
 Popy - Momo
 Alamgir
 Tarik Anam Khan -
 Rahamat Ali -
 Arunav Anjan -
 MM Morshed -
 Ahsanul Haque Minu -

Accolades

National Film Awards
 Won Best Singer - Asif Akbar 2006 for "Amar Majhe Nei Ekhon Ami"
 Won Best Singer Samina Chowdhury 2006 for "Amar Majhe Nei Ekhon Ami"

Music
The soundtrack for the film 'Rani Kuthir Baki Itihash all Song lyrics by Kabir Bakul with music composed and directed by the singer SI Tutul.

Soundtrack

Track listing

References

External links
 

2006 films
2006 romantic drama films
Bengali-language Bangladeshi films
Bangladeshi romantic drama films
Films scored by S I Tutul
2000s Bengali-language films
2006 drama films